The 2017–18 Women's EHF Cup was the 37th edition of EHF's second-tier women's handball competition. It started on 8 September 2017.

SCM Craiova defeated Vipers Kristiansand 52–51 in the final to win their first title.

Overview

Team allocation

The labels in the parentheses show how each team qualified for the place of its starting round:
TH: Title holders
CWC: EHF Women's Cup Winners' Cup holders
1st, 2nd, 3rd, 4th, 5th, 6th, etc.: League position
CW: Domestic cup winners
CR: Domestic cup runners-up
CL QT: Losers from the Champions League qualification stage.
CL Group: Losers from the Champions League group stage.

Round and draw dates
The schedule of the competition was as follows (all draws were held at the EHF headquarters in Vienna, Austria):

Qualification stage

Round 1
There is 28 teams participating in round 1.

{{TwoLegResult|Nur Mingechavir|AZE|53–5111|Lugi HF'|SWE|24–24|29–27}}
|}

Notes

1 Both legs were hosted by KHF Prishtina.
2 Both legs were hosted by Váci NKSE.
3 Both legs were hosted by Metraco Zagłębie Lubin.
4 Both legs were hosted by CSM Roman.
5 Both legs were hosted by Silkeborg-Voel KFUM.
6 Both legs were hosted by Cercle Dijon Bourgogne.
7 Both legs were hosted by DHC Slavia Prague.
8 Both legs were hosted by Byåsen Handball Elite.
9 Both legs were hosted by ŽRK Medicinar.
10 Both legs were hosted by Ankara Yenimahalle BSK.
11 Both legs were hosted by Nur Mingechavir.

Round 2
There is 32 teams participating in round 2.

14 teams who qualified from round 1 and 18 teams joining the draw.

|}
Notes

1 Both legs were hosted by Tertnes Bergen.
2 Both legs were hosted by Kastamonu Belediyesi.
3 Both legs were hosted by Zvezda Zvenigorod.
4 Both legs were hosted by Viborg HK.
5 Order of legs reversed after original draw.
6 Both legs were hosted by CB Atlético Guardés.
7 Both legs were hosted by Kuban.

Round 3

|}

 Group stage 

The seedings were announced on 23 November 2017.

Teams in the draw will be protected against meeting teams from the same country in the same group. In each group, teams played against each other in a double round-robin format, with home and away matches.

Group A

Group B

Group C

Group D

Knockout stage
The draw event was held at the EHF Office in Vienna on Tuesday 13 February at 11:00 hrs. The draw had determined the quarter-final and also the semi-final pairings.

Quarterfinals

Seeding

The first quarter-final leg was scheduled for 3 March, while the second leg followed one week later.

|}

MatchesSCM Craiova won 49–48 on aggregate.Kastamonu Belediyesi won 55–53 on aggregate.Vipers Kristiansand won 55–51 on aggregate.Viborg HK won 55–47 on aggregate. Semifinals 

The semi-finals were played in the first half of April.

|}

MatchesSCM Craiova won 41–40 on aggregate.Vipers Kristiansand won 60–57 on aggregate. Final 

|}

MatchesSCM Craiova won 52–51 on aggregate.''

Top goalscorers

See also
2017–18 Women's EHF Champions League

References

External links
 Official website

 
Women's EHF Cup seasons
EHF Cup Women
EHF Cup Women